Pagwa River is a community in the Cochrane District of Ontario. It is a part of Cochrane, Unorganized, North Part in Canadian census data.

History
It was named a railway divisional point because of its major junction of the railway and the Pagwachuan River. Here, it supported a fur trading post. Packet steamers ran between Pagwa and James Bay to serve the Revillon Freres trading post and community early in the 1900s. Pagwa then became the site of an airfield and airforce base of the Pinetree Line Distant Early Warning system, which was decommissioned in 1968.  From 1952 to after 1962, this station was operated by the United States Air Force's 913th Aircraft Control and Warning Squadron.

In its heyday, Pagwa was busy with commercial activity. Goods transported by rail to Pagwa for the Trade Post were unloaded from boxcars onto a long wooden chute that slid the goods downhill to the doorstep of the Post. Each year large wooden barges were constructed at Pagwa to float goods by steamer to villages along the Kenogami and Albany Rivers as far as Ogoki and Fort Albany. The barges were built from douglas-fir timbers brought from British Columbia by rail (R. Ferris, 2010).

The tracks and the top surface sheathing of the railway bridge are presently removed. The bridge was last used by Thunderhouse Forest Services Inc as access for a treeplanting operation on the west side of the Pagwachuan River in 2006. The Ontario Ministry of Natural Resources, Geraldton Area Office, blocked use of the bridge later that year.

Commercial activity and population began declining after the Trans-Canada Highway opened up the region post World War II. Some of the original townsite has been purchased. Today, there are a few private cottages and seasonal homes, mostly owned by residents of Constance Lake First Nation and Hearst, Ontario. Some residents of Constance Lake today were born at Pagwa and spent many years of their lives there.

References

Communities in Cochrane District